A list of songs recorded by English rock band the Police.

Key
, indicates single release

Notes

References

External links

Police, The